Oklahoma Territory is a 1960 American Western film directed by Edward L. Cahn and starring Bill Williams and Gloria Talbott.

Plot
District attorney Temple Houston prosecutes a leading Indian chief (the father of his longtime friend Ruth) suspected of murder, despite the very real possibility of open tribe revolts. He reopens the case though when signs begin to point to a frame-up, putting his life and career on the line to find the real culprits.

Cast
 Bill Williams as Temple Houston
 Gloria Talbott as Ruth Red Hawk
 Ted de Corsia as Buffalo Horn
 Grant Richards as Bigelow
 Walter Sande as Marshal Pete Rosslyn
 X Brands as Running Cloud
 Walter Baldwin as Ward Harlan
 Grandon Rhodes as George Blackwell
 John Cliff as Larkin (uncredited)

See also
 List of American films of 1960

References

External links
 
 
 

1960 films
1960 Western (genre) films
American black-and-white films
American Western (genre) films
1960s English-language films
Films directed by Edward L. Cahn
Films produced by Edward Small
Films scored by Albert Glasser
United Artists films
1960s American films